Martin Bulloch (born 14 August 1974) is a Scottish musician, best known for being the drummer in the rock band Mogwai.

Early life
Bulloch was born in Bellshill, North Lanarkshire, Scotland. He was once a cook at a Chinese restaurant in East Kilbride. He uses a pacemaker which was the reason he is credited as bionic on the album, Mogwai Young Team.

Career

Mogwai

Bulloch plays drums in the Glaswegian post-rock group Mogwai. Mogwai was formed in 1995 by friends Stuart Braithwaite, Dominic Aitchison, and Bulloch.

Other
Bulloch has also drummed for Arab Strap and Gruff Rhys at some gigs.

References

Mogwai members
Living people
Scottish drummers
British male drummers
1974 births
21st-century drummers